Peter of Limoges ( or ; ;  – 1306) was the author of A Moral Treatise on the Eye or On the Moral Eye, a popular guide for Catholic priests, composed at the University of Paris sometime in the 1270s or '80s. The work depended heavily on Roger Bacon's earlier treatment of optics. 

Peter of Limoges was the friend of Robert de Sorbonne and also taught at the University of Sorbonne. He was a disciple of Ramon Llull.

He may be identical to the Peter of Limoges who was the first known dean of the faculty of medicine at the University of Paris, attested in 1267 and 1270.

Bibliography
 .

Citations

Further reading
 .

1240s births
1306 deaths
Academic staff of the University of Paris
People from Limoges